"Not Me" is Amy Pearson's second single from her debut album Who I Am. It charted at number 37 in the ARIA Singles Chart.

Song meaning 
The song was written by Pearson and is said to be about a pushy partner who wanted to know everything there is to know about her.

Track listing 
"Not Me"
"Not Me" (Screw You Mix)
"Don't Miss You" (Pop Embassy Remix)
"Not Me" (A Cappella)

Charts 
"Not Me" debuted in the ARIA top 50 singles chart at 37 on 28 November 2007 then falling to position 47 for two weeks before exiting. Then two weeks later on 2 December 2007 re-entering at 47.

References 

2007 singles
Amy Pearson songs
Songs written by Amy Pearson
Song recordings produced by Fraser T. Smith
2007 songs
Sony BMG singles